This is a list of topics on mathematical permutations.

Particular kinds of permutations 

Alternating permutation
Circular shift
Cyclic permutation
Derangement
Even and odd permutations—see Parity of a permutation
Josephus permutation
Parity of a permutation
Separable permutation
Stirling permutation
Superpattern
Transposition (mathematics)
Unpredictable permutation

Combinatorics of permutations 

Bijection
Combination
Costas array
Cycle index
Cycle notation
Cycles and fixed points
Cyclic order
Direct sum of permutations
Enumerations of specific permutation classes
Factorial
Falling factorial
Permutation matrix
Generalized permutation matrix
Inversion (discrete mathematics)
Major index
Ménage problem
Permutation graph
Permutation pattern
Permutation polynomial
Permutohedron
Rencontres numbers
Robinson–Schensted correspondence
Sum of permutations:
Direct sum of permutations
Skew sum of permutations
Stanley–Wilf conjecture
Symmetric function
Szymanski's conjecture
Twelvefold way

Permutation groups and other algebraic structures

Groups 

Alternating group
Automorphisms of the symmetric and alternating groups
Block (permutation group theory)
Cayley's theorem
Cycle index
Frobenius group
Galois group of a polynomial
Jucys–Murphy element
Landau's function
Oligomorphic group
O'Nan–Scott theorem
Parker vector
Permutation group
Place-permutation action
Primitive permutation group
Rank 3 permutation group
Representation theory of the symmetric group
Schreier vector
Strong generating set
Symmetric group
Symmetric inverse semigroup
Weak order of permutations
Wreath product
Young symmetrizer
Zassenhaus group
Zolotarev's lemma

Other algebraic structures 

Burnside ring

Mathematical analysis 

 Conditionally convergent series
 Riemann series theorem
 Lévy–Steinitz theorem

Mathematics applicable to physical sciences 

Antisymmetrizer
Identical particles
Levi-Civita symbol

Number theory 

Permutable prime

Algorithms and information processing 

Bit-reversal permutation
Claw-free permutation
Heap's algorithm
Permutation automaton
Schreier vector
Sorting algorithm
Sorting network
Substitution–permutation network
Steinhaus–Johnson–Trotter algorithm
Tompkins–Paige algorithm

Cryptography 

Permutation box
Substitution box
Permutation cipher
Substitution cipher
Transposition cipher

Probability, stochastic processes, and statistics 

Combinatorial data analysis
Ewens' sampling formula
Fisher–Yates shuffle
Order statistic
Permutational analysis of variance
Rankit
Resampling (statistics)
Seriation (statistics)

Random permutations 

Golomb–Dickman constant
Random permutation
Random permutation statistics

Music 

Change ringing
Method ringing
Permutation (music)

Games 

Faro shuffle
Fifteen puzzle
Shuffling

Permutations